The 1978 Men's World Water Polo Championship was the third edition of the men's water polo tournament at the World Aquatics Championships, organised by the world governing body in aquatics, the FINA. The tournament was held from 19 to 27 August 1978, and was incorporated into the 1978 World Aquatics Championships in West Berlin, West Germany.

Participating teams

Groups formed

GROUP A

GROUP B

GROUP C

GROUP D

First round

Group A

 19 August 1978

 20 August 1978

 21 August 1978

Group B

 19 August 1978

 20 August 1978

 21 August 1978

Group C

 19 August 1978

 20 August 1978

 21 August 1978

Group D

 19 August 1978

 20 August 1978

 21 August 1978

Second round

Group E

First round results apply.

 22 August 1978

 23 August 1978

Group F

First round results apply.

 22 August 1978

 23 August 1978

Group G

First round results apply.

 22 August 1978

 23 August 1978

Group H

First round results apply.

 22 August 1978

 23 August 1978

Final round

13th – 16th places (Group K)

 25 August 1978

 26 August 1978

 27 August 1978

9th – 12th places (Group J)

 25 August 1978

 26 August 1978

 27 August 1978

5th – 8th places (Group I)

 25 August 1978

 26 August 1978

 27 August 1978

1st - 4th places Final standings (Group L)

 25 August 1978

 26 August 1978

 27 August 1978

Final ranking

Medalists

References

External links
 3rd FINA World Championships 1978, West Berlin - Water polo Men's Tournament www.fina.org]
 Men Water Polo 3rd World Championship 1978 West Berlin www.todor66.com
 Results 

Men
1978
1978 in German sport